Events from the year 2003 in South Korea.

Incumbents
 President: 
 Kim Dae-jung (until 24 February),
 Roh Moo-hyun (starting 24 February)
 Prime Minister: 
 Kim Suk-soo (until 26 February), 
 Goh Kun (starting 26 February)

Events 

 February 18: Daegu subway fire: 192 people die when an arsonist sets fire to a subway train.
 February 26: Goh Kun becomes prime minister of South Korea, replacing Kim Suk-soo
 May 10: The Seoul National University Bundang Hospital begins its first treatment.
 September 12: Typhoon Maemi
 November 27: 2003 Mnet Asian Music Awards
 December: The Face Shop is founded.

Sport
 The Korea National League is founded.
 2003 Asian Judo Championships held in Jeju City
 2003 Asian Cycling Championships
 2003 Summer Universiade
 South Korea at the 2003 Asian Winter Games
 World Cyber Games 2003
 2003 K League
 2003 K2 League
 2003 Korean FA Cup
 2003 Peace Cup

Film
 List of South Korean films of 2003

Births

 January 19 – Kim Hee-seung, footballer
 February 3 – Lee Chan-wook, footballer
 March 1 – Park Chang-woo, footballer
 March 6 – Lee Seung-won, footballer
 March 26 – Kang Seong-jin, footballer
 April 1 – Hwang In-taek, footballer
 April 5 – Lee Seung-hwan, footballer
 April 8 – Kim Gyeong-hwan, footballer
 May 13 – Moon Hyun-ho, footballer
 May 14 – Kang Min-jae, footballer
 May 19 – Park Hyeon-bin, footballer
 May 20 – Jeon Min-seo, actress
 May 20 – Kim Yong-hak, footballer
 May 23 – Lee Young-jun, footballer
 June 3 – Kim Jun-hong, footballer
 June 18 – Park Jun-young, footballer
 July 14 – Lee Jun-jae, footballer
 August 19 – Choi Ye-hoon, footballer
 September 1 – Park Seung-ho, footballer
 November 19 – Lee Jun-sang, footballer
 December 11 – Bae Seo-joon, footballer

Deaths

See also
2003 in South Korean music

References

 
South Korea
Years of the 21st century in South Korea
2000s in South Korea
South Korea
South Korea